The economy of Kuwait is a wealthy petroleum-based economy. Kuwait is one of the richest countries in the world. The Kuwaiti dinar is the highest-valued unit of currency in the world. According to the World Bank, Kuwait is the fifth richest country in the world by gross national income per capita. Kuwait's economy is the world's twentieth-largest by GDP per capita. As a result of various diversification policies, petroleum now accounts for 43% of the total GDP and 70% of export earnings. Steel manufacturing is Kuwait's second biggest industry. Kuwait is self-sufficient in steel.

In 2019, Kuwait's main export products were mineral fuels including oil (89.1% of total exports), aircraft and spacecraft (4.3%), organic chemicals (3.2%), plastics (1.2%), iron and steel (0.2%), gems and precious metals (0.1%), machinery including computers (0.1%), aluminum (0.1%), copper (0.1%), and salt, sulphur, stone and cement (0.1%). Kuwait was the world's biggest exporter of sulfonated, nitrated and nitrosated hydrocarbons in 2019. Kuwait was ranked 63rd out of 157 countries in the 2019 Economic Complexity Index (ECI). Iraq was Kuwait's leading export market in 2019 and food/agricultural products accounted for 94.2% of total export commodities.

Petroleum and natural gas 

In 1934, the Emir of Kuwait granted an oil concession to the Kuwait Oil Co. (KOC), jointly owned by the Anglo-Persian Oil Company (later British Petroleum Company) and Gulf Oil Corporation In 1976, the Kuwaiti Government nationalized KOC.

The Kuwait Petroleum Corporation (KPC), an integrated international oil company, is the parent company of the government's operations in the petroleum sector, and includes Kuwait Oil Company, which produced oil and gas; Kuwait National Petroleum Co., refining and domestic sales; Petrochemical Industries Co., producing ammonia and urea; Kuwait Foreign Petroleum Exploration Co., with several concessions in developing countries; Kuwait Oil Tanker Co.; and Santa Fe International Corp. The latter, purchased outright in 1982, gives KPC a worldwide presence in the petroleum industry.

KPC also has purchased from Gulf Oil Co. refineries and associated service stations in the Benelux nations and Scandinavia, as well as storage facilities and a network of service stations in Italy. In 1987, KPC bought a 19% share in British Petroleum, which was later reduced to 10%. KPC markets its products in Europe under the brand Q8 and is interested in the markets of the United States and Japan.

During the Iraqi occupation, Kuwait's oil-producing capacity was reduced to practically nothing. However, tremendous recovery and improvements have been made since. Kuwait's production capacity is estimated to be .

Environmental sustainability
As part of Kuwait Vision 2035, Kuwait aims to position itself as a global hub for the petrochemical industry. Al Zour Refinery is the largest refinery in the Middle East. It is Kuwait's largest environmental friendly oil refinery. Al Zour Refinery is a Kuwait-China cooperation project under the Belt and Road Initiative. 

Al Zour LNG Terminal is the Middle East's largest import terminal for liquefied natural gas. It is the world's largest capacity LNG storage and regasification green field project. The project has attracted investments worth US$3 billion. Other megaprojects include biofuel and clean fuels. Sulaibiya Wastewater Treatment Plant is the world's largest wastewater purification plant using energy efficient membrane technology. Umm Al Hayman Wastewater Treatment Plant is one of the world's largest ecologically sustainable sewage treatment plants. With an estimated value of US$1.8 billion, it is a pioneering PPP megaproject. It was the region's fourth largest megaproject awarded in 2020. 

Kuwait Environmental Remediation Programme (KERP) is the largest environmental remediation project in the world. There are various other major infrastructure projects under Kuwait Vision 2035. Kuwait is currently building the largest judicial building in the Middle East, the new judicial complexes are environment friendly. Other major landmark developments include KIPCO's Hessah Al Mubarak District.

Renewable energy
As part of Kuwait Vision 2035, Kuwait inaugurated its largest renewable energy park, Shagaya Renewable Energy Park, which includes concentrated solar power, solar photovoltaic, and wind power plants. The park consists of four phases with a target capacity of 4,000 MW. It is set to be one of the largest renewable energy parks in the world.

Steel manufacturing
Steel manufacturing is Kuwait's second biggest industry. United Steel Industrial Company (KWT Steel) is Kuwait's main steel manufacturing company, the company caters to all of Kuwait's domestic market demands (particularly construction). Kuwait is self-sufficient in steel.

Agriculture
In 2016, Kuwait's food self-sufficiency ratio was 49.5% in vegetables, 38.7% in meat, 12.4% in diary, 24.9% in fruits, and 0.4% in cereals. 8.5% of Kuwait's entire territory consists of agricultural land, while arable land covers 0.6% of Kuwait's entire territory. Historically, Jahra was a predominantly agricultural area. There are currently various farms in Jahra.

In 2017, agriculture (including fisheries) accounted for almost 0.4 percent of the gross domestic product. Around 4 percent of the economically active population works in agriculture, almost all foreigners. The majority of farm owners are investors. The total agricultural land covered 1,521 sq km in 2014.

The agriculture industry is hampered by the limited water and arable land. The government has experimented in growing food through hydroponics and carefully managed farms. However, most of the soil which was suitable for farming in south central Kuwait was destroyed when Iraqi troops set fire to oil wells in the area and created vast "oil lakes". Fish and shrimp are plentiful in territorial waters, and largescale commercial fishing has been undertaken locally and in the Indian Ocean.

Finance
Kuwait has a leading position in the financial industry in the GCC. The Emir has promoted the idea that Kuwait should focus its energies, in terms of economic development, on the financial industry.

The historical preeminence of Kuwait (among the Gulf monarchies) in finance dates back to the founding of the National Bank of Kuwait in 1952. The bank was the first local publicly traded corporation in the Gulf. In the late 1970s and early 1980s, an alternative stock market, trading in shares of Gulf companies, emerged in Kuwait, the Souk Al-Manakh. At its peak, its market capitalization was the third highest in the world, behind only the U.S. and Japan, and ahead of the UK and France.

Kuwait has a large wealth-management industry that stands out in the region. Kuwaiti investment companies administer more assets than those of any other GCC country, save the much larger Saudi Arabia. The Kuwait Financial Centre, in a rough calculation, estimated that Kuwaiti firms accounted for over one-third of the total assets under management in the GCC.

The relative strength of Kuwait in the financial industry extends to its stock market. For many years, the total valuation of all companies listed on the Kuwaiti exchange far exceeded the value of those on any other GCC bourse, except Saudi Arabia. In 2011, financial and banking companies made up more than half of the market capitalization of the Kuwaiti bourse; among all the Gulf states, the market capitalization of Kuwaiti financial-sector firms was, in total, behind only that of Saudi Arabia. In recent years, Kuwaiti investment companies have invested large percentages of their assets abroad, and their foreign assets have become substantially larger than their domestic assets.

Kuwait is a major source of foreign economic assistance to other states through the Kuwait Fund for Arab Economic Development, an autonomous state institution created in 1961 on the pattern of Western and international development agencies. Over the years aid was annually provided to Egypt, Syria, and Jordan, as well as the Palestine Liberation Organization. In 1974, the fund's lending mandate was expanded to include all developing countries in the world.

Reserve funds

The Kuwait Investment Authority (KIA) is Kuwait's sovereign wealth fund specializing in foreign investment. The KIA is the world's oldest sovereign wealth fund. Since 1953, the Kuwaiti government has directed investments into Europe, United States and Asia Pacific. In 2021, the holdings were valued at around $700 billion in assets. It is the 3rd largest sovereign wealth fund in the world.

The KIA manages two funds: the General Reserve Fund (GRF) and Future Generations Fund (FGF). The GRF is the main treasurer for the government. It receives all state revenues and all national expenditures are paid out of this fund. The KIA does not disclose its financial assets in public, but it is estimated that the KIA has $410 billion in assets as of February 2014.

The KIA was the main source of capital for the Kuwaiti government during the Gulf War. The Kuwaiti government relied on the KIA to pay for coalition expenses and postwar reconstruction. The KIA was worth $100 billion prior to 1990, KIA funds were depleted to $40–$50 billion after the Gulf War.

Future Generations Fund
The Future Generations Fund (FGF) was created in 1976 by transferring 50% from the general reserve fund at that time. The FGF is a saving funds for future generations. 25% of all state revenues are annually transferred to the fund.

All of the FGF is invested abroad, with an estimated 75% invested in the US and Europe and the rest in emerging markets, mainly China and India.

Science and technology
Kuwait has a growing scientific research sector. According to the United States Patent and Trademark Office, Kuwait has registered 448 patents as of 31 December 2015, Kuwait is the second largest patent producer in the Arab world. In the early 2010s, Kuwait produced the largest number of scientific publications and patents per capita in the Arab world and OIC. The Kuwaiti government has implemented various programs to foster innovation resulting in patent rights. Between 2010 and 2014, Kuwait registered the highest growth in patents in the Arab world. The WIPO Global Innovation Index found that Kuwait ranks relatively high for its innovation efficiency ratio (which shows how much innovation output a country is getting for its inputs).

Kuwait was the first country in the region to implement 5G technology. Kuwait is among the world's leading countries in 5G penetration. The Chinese company Huawei has a $1.7 billion investment license in Kuwait to develop the country's ICT sector in line with the Kuwait Vision 2035 strategy.

Space

Kuwait has an emerging space industry driven by the private sector.

Kuwait's first satellite 
Kuwait's Orbital Space in collaboration with the Space Challenges Program and EnduroSat introduced an international initiative called "Code in Space". The initiative allows students from around the world to send and execute their own code in space. The code is then executed by the satellite's onboard computer and tested under real space environment conditions. The nanosatellite is called "QMR-KWT" (Arabic: قمر الكويت) which means "Moon of Kuwait", translated from Arabic.

QMR-KWT launched to space on 30 June 2021 on SpaceX Falcon 9 Block 5 rocket and was part of the payload of a satellite carrier called ION SCV Dauntless David by D-Orbit. It was deployed into its final orbit (Sun-synchronous orbit) on 16 July 2021. QMR-KWT is Kuwait's first satellite.

Um Alaish 4 
Seven years after the launch of the world's first communications satellite, Telstar 1, Kuwait in October 1969 inaugurated the first satellite ground station in the Middle East, "Um Alaish". The Um Alaish satellite station complex housed several satellite ground stations including Um Alaish 1 (1969), Um Alaish 2 (1977), and Um Alaish 3 (1981). It provided satellite communication services in Kuwait until 1990 when it was destroyed by the Iraqi armed forces during the Iraqi invasion of Kuwait. In 2019, Kuwait's Orbital Space established an amateur satellite ground station to provide free access to signals from satellites in orbit passing over Kuwait. The station was named Um Alaish 4 to continue the legacy of "Um Alaish" satellite station. Um Alaish 4 is member of FUNcube distributed ground station network and the Satellite Networked Open Ground Station project (SatNOGS).

Kuwait Space Rocket

The Kuwait Space Rocket (KSR) is a Kuwaiti project to build and launch the first suborbital liquid bi-propellant rocket in Arabia.

TSCK experiment in space
Kuwait's Orbital Space in collaboration with the Kuwait Scientific Center (TSCK) introduced for the first time in Kuwait the opportunity for students to send a science experiment to space. The objectives of this initiative was to allow students to learn about (a) how science space missions are done; (b) microgravity (weightlessness) environment; (c) how to do science like a real scientist. This opportunity was made possible through Orbital Space agreement with DreamUp PBC and Nanoracks LLC, which are collaborating with NASA under a Space Act Agreement. The students' experiment was named "Kuwait’s Experiment: E.coli Consuming Carbon Dioxide to Combat Climate Change". The experiment was launched on SpaceX CRS-21 (SpX-21) spaceflight to the International Space Station (ISS) on 6 December 2020. Astronauts Shannon Walker (member of the ISS Expedition 64) conducted the experiment on behalf of the students.

National satellite project
In July 2021, Kuwait University announced that it is launching a national satellite project as part of state-led efforts to pioneer the country's sustainable space sector.

Health

Kuwait has a state-funded healthcare system, which provides treatment without charge to Kuwaiti nationals. There are outpatient clinics in every residential area in Kuwait. A public insurance scheme exists to provide reduced cost healthcare to expatriates. Private healthcare providers also run medical facilities in the country, available to members of their insurance schemes. As part of Kuwait Vision 2035, many new hospitals have opened. In the years leading up to the COVID-19 pandemic, Kuwait invested in its health care system at a rate that was proportionally higher than most other GCC countries. As a result, the public hospital sector significantly increased its capacity. Kuwait currently has 20 public hospitals. The new Sheikh Jaber Al-Ahmad Hospital is considered the largest hospital in the Middle East. Kuwait also has 16 private hospitals.

Entrepreneurship
In the past five years, there has been a significant rise in entrepreneurship and small business creation in Kuwait. The informal sector is also on the rise, mainly due to the popularity of Instagram businesses. In 2020, Kuwait ranked fourth in the MENA region in startup funding after the UAE, Egypt and Saudi Arabia.

Many Kuwaiti entrepreneurs use the Instagram-based business model.

Tourism

In 2020, Kuwait's domestic travel and tourism spending reached $6.1 billion (up from $1.6 billion in 2019) with family tourism a rapidly growing segment. The WTTC named Kuwait as one of the world's fastest-growing countries in travel and tourism GDP in 2019, with 11.6% year-on-year growth. In 2016, the tourism industry generated nearly $500 million in revenue. In 2015, tourism accounted for 1.5 percent of the GDP.

The Amiri Diwan recently inaugurated the new Kuwait National Cultural District (KNCD), which comprises Sheikh Abdullah Al Salem Cultural Centre, Sheikh Jaber Al Ahmad Cultural Centre, Al Shaheed Park, and Al Salam Palace. With a capital cost of more than US$1 billion, the project is one of the largest cultural investments in the world. In November 2016, the Sheikh Jaber Al Ahmad Cultural Centre opened. It is the largest cultural centre and opera house in the Middle East. The Kuwait National Cultural District is a member of the Global Cultural Districts Network. The annual "Hala Febrayer" festival attracts many tourists from neighboring GCC countries, and includes a variety of events including music concerts, parades, and carnivals. The festival is a month-long commemoration of the liberation of Kuwait, and runs from 1 to 28 February. Liberation Day itself is celebrated on 26 February.

Transport

Kuwait has an extensive and modern network of highways. There are more than 2 million passenger cars, and 500,000 commercial taxis, buses, and trucks in use. Since there is no railway system in the country, most people travel by automobiles.

The country's public transportation network consists almost entirely of bus routes. The state owned Kuwait Public Transportation Company was established in 1962. It runs local bus routes across Kuwait as well as longer distance services to other Gulf states. The main private bus company is CityBus, which operates about 20 routes across the country. Another private bus company, Kuwait Gulf Link Public Transport Services, was started in 2006. It runs local bus routes across Kuwait and longer distance services to neighbouring Arab countries.

There are two airports in Kuwait. Kuwait International Airport serves as the principal hub for international air travel. State-owned Kuwait Airways is the largest airline in the country. A portion of the airport complex is designated as Al Mubarak Air Base, which contains the headquarters of the Kuwait Air Force, as well as the Kuwait Air Force Museum. In 2004, the first private airline of Kuwait, Jazeera Airways, was launched. In 2005, the second private airline, Wataniya Airways was founded.

Kuwait has one of the largest shipping industries in the region. The Kuwait Ports Public Authority manages and operates ports across Kuwait. The country’s principal commercial seaports are Shuwaikh and Shuaiba which handled combined cargo of 753,334 TEU in 2006. Mina Al-Ahmadi, the largest port in the country, handles most of Kuwait's oil exports. Mubarak Al Kabeer Port in Bubiyan Island is currently under construction. The port is expected to handle 2 million TEU when operations start.

Macro-Economic 
The following table shows the main economic indicators in 1980–2017.

See also
 Energy in Kuwait
 Telecommunications in Kuwait
 List of companies of Kuwait

References

External links
 Kuwait Investment Authority
 Kuwait Investment Office
 

 
Kuwait
Economy of the Arab League
Kuwait